Air Commandant Dame Lena Annette Jean Conan Doyle, Lady Bromet,  (21 December 1912 – 18 November 1997) was a British military officer in the Women's Royal Air Force.

The second daughter of Sir Arthur Conan Doyle, she was a spirited child who was described as a tomboy by Harry Houdini. Her childhood nickname was "Billy", and letters to her father would be signed "Your loving son." On her tenth birthday, however, she announced that she had decided to be a girl after all. She then went to her Aunt Ida's school, Granville House in Eastbourne, where she took after her mother in developing a love of nature. As a schoolgirl she was a classmate and friend of Joan Boniface Winnifrith, who would become film and television actress Anna Lee. Winnifrith was Sir Arthur Conan Doyle's god-daughter.

Career
She attended school at Granville House, Eastbourne, and went on to serve for thirty years in the Women's Auxiliary Air Force (WAAF), where she worked in intelligence during World War II. Commissioned a section officer, she was promoted to temporary flight officer on 1 February 1942 and to temporary squadron officer on 1 July 1944.

On 19 June 1947, Acting Wing Officer Conan Doyle was granted a short-service commission as a flight officer in the WAAF, G Branch, with seniority from 26 September 1943. She was appointed OBE (Military Division) in the 1948 New Year Honours, she was granted a permanent commission as a wing officer in the secretarial branch of the renamed Women's Royal Air Force (WRAF) on 1 February 1949.

She was promoted to group officer on 1 January 1952 On 1 April 1963, she was promoted to air commandant, the highest rank in the Women's Royal Air Force. On 29 April of the same year, she was appointed an honorary Aide-de-Camp to Queen Elizabeth II, serving until 1966.

In the 1963 Birthday Honours, she was elevated to Dame Commander of the Order of the British Empire (DBE, Military Division), and was known as Dame Jean Conan Doyle. On 11 May 1966, she retired from the WRAF. She gained the additional style Lady Bromet upon marrying Air Vice-Marshal Sir Geoffrey Rhodes Bromet (1891–1983). Her husband served a term as Lieutenant-Governor of the Isle of Man; the couple had no children.

Literary estate
Upon the death of her brother, Adrian, in 1970, Dame Jean became her father's literary executor and the legal copyright holder to some of the rights to the Sherlock Holmes character as well as her father's other works. She assiduously defended Sherlock Holmes' character. She and her brothers, Adrian and Denis Conan Doyle, Arthur Conan Doyle's children by his second wife (Jean, Lady Conan Doyle) inherited the copyrights with the estate when their mother died in 1940. 

Dame Jean said that Sherlock Holmes was her family's curse because of the fighting over copyrights. She and the widows of her brothers initially shared control of Sir Arthur Conan Doyle's literary trust; however, the women did not get along. Denis Conan Doyle had married a Georgian princess known as Princess  Nina M'divani and died in 1955.

Using a loan from the Royal Bank of Scotland (RBS), in 1970 Princess Nina bought the estate and established Baskervilles Investments Ltd. in the Isle of Man. Eventually, the princess fell dramatically behind on the loan, and the RBS ended up with the rights to Sir Arthur Conan Doyle's works. The bank then sold the rights to Lady Etelka Duncan whose former son-in-law, Sheldon Reynolds, produced two series of Sherlock Holmes adaptations, in the 1950s and the 1990s. His ex-wife, Lady Duncan's daughter, administered the Sir Arthur Conan Doyle Literary Estate until November 2014.

Conan Doyle Estate Ltd., a privately owned UK company formed in 2005, claims that Dame Jean regained some of the US rights following the passage of the Copyright Act of 1976, although all works of Arthur Conan Doyle's published after 1 November 1925 remain with the Sir Arthur Conan Doyle Literary Estate, which sued the Executors of the Dame Jean Conan Doyle Estate for infringement of copyright. When Warner Brothers made Sherlock Holmes, released in 2009, the studio was granted a license in 2006 by the Arthur Conan Doyle Literary Estate and ended up signing a "Covenant not to Sue" a year later with Conan Doyle Estate Ltd.

At her death at age 84, Dame Jean's will stipulated that any remaining copyrights she owned were to be transferred to the Royal National Institute for the Blind. According to a 1990 interview, Dame Jean's eyesight was poor from an early age. The National Institute for the Blind sold the rights back to the Conan Doyle heirs. (As of 2015 there were eight surviving Conan Doyle heirs. None is a direct descendant, as neither Jean nor her brothers had any children.)

On her death her cremated ashes were interred with those of her husband and his first wife in the churchyard of All Saints Church in Minstead in Hampshire.

References

Sources
 Biography, ash-nyc.com; accessed 23 March 2014.

Media

1912 births
1997 deaths.
British women in World War II
Women's Auxiliary Air Force officers
Dames Commander of the Order of the British Empire
Women's Royal Air Force officers
Arthur Conan Doyle
Neurological disease deaths in England
People from Eastbourne
Deaths from Parkinson's disease
Place of birth missing
Place of death missing
Wives of knights
Jean Conan